Libertiamo is a libertarian association chaired by Benedetto Della Vedova.

The group is the continuation of the Liberal Reformers (RL), an associate party of Forza Italia, formed in 2007 by Benedetto Della Vedova, a former President of the Italian Radicals who disagreed with the party's alliance with the centre-left. In 2009, with the official merger of Forza Italia into The People of Freedom (PdL), Della Vedova chose to dissolve the RL and to launch a new association, open to people coming from different upbringings.

By 2010 Della Vedova distanced from his mentor Silvio Berlusconi and got very close to Gianfranco Fini and his Generation Italy instead, thus becoming a leading member of the party's internal minority. The main reason for that is that Fini, a conservative with socially liberal instincts, and Della Vedova agreed on ethical issues such as abortion, stem-cell research, end-of-life and advance health care directive.

In July 2010, along with most Finiani, Della Vedova left the PdL group in the Chamber and became vice president of Future and Freedom (FLI).

Leadership
 President: Benedetto Della Vedova (2009–present)
 Vice President: Piercamillo Falasca (2009–present)
 Director: Carmelo Palma (2009–present)

References

External links
 Official website
 Generation Italy

Organisations associated with The People of Freedom
Libertarianism in Italy